The 2015 Miami Dolphins season was the franchise's 46th season in the National Football League and the 50th overall. The Dolphins looked to improve on their 8-8 record from 2014 and return to the playoffs for the first time in seven seasons. However, Miami failed to clinch a playoff berth for the seventh consecutive season after a Week 14 loss to the Giants.

The Dolphins entered 2015 with Joe Philbin as their head coach for a fourth season. After the team started 1−3, Philbin was fired by the Dolphins. Dan Campbell, the team's tight ends coach, served as the interim head coach for the remainder of the season and recorded a 5−7 record.

Highlights from the season include the Dolphins' first-ever victory over the Houston Texans, their first win over the Philadelphia Eagles since 1999, and their first road win over the Washington Redskins since 1984.

Free agents

2015 draft

Notes
 The Dolphins traded their second-round selection (No. 47 overall) to the Philadelphia Eagles in exchange for Philadelphia's second-round (No. 52 overall) and two fifth-round selections (No. 145 and 156 overall).
 The Dolphins traded their third-round selection (No. 78 overall) and linebacker Dannell Ellerbe to the New Orleans Saints in exchange for wide receiver Kenny Stills.
 The Dolphins acquired an additional fifth-round selection (No. 149 overall) in a trade that sent their seventh-round selection (No. 232 overall — previously acquired in a trade that sent offensive tackle Jonathan Martin to the San Francisco 49ers) and wide receiver Mike Wallace to the Minnesota Vikings.
 The Dolphins traded their original seventh-round selection (No. 231 overall) to the Baltimore Ravens in exchange for offensive tackle Bryant McKinnie during the  season.

Staff

Final roster

Preseason

Regular season

Schedule

Note: Intra-division opponents are in bold text.

Game summaries

Week 1: at Washington Redskins
With the win, the Dolphins started 1-0 for the second straight year. This was the Dolphins' first road win over the Redskins since their 1984 Super Bowl season.

Week 2: at Jacksonville Jaguars
Jacksonville kicker Jason Myers would kick the game winning 28 yard field goal with under 2 minutes left to give the Jags the win.

With the loss, the Dolphins fell to 1-1.

Week 3: vs. Buffalo Bills
Ryan Tannehill would be intercepted 3 times in this game, including a pick 6 by Preston Brown, and the Bills trounced Miami in their home opener 41-14.

With the embarrassing loss, the Dolphins fell to 1-2. This was also the worst home opening defeat in franchise history.

Week 4: vs. New York Jets
NFL International Series

The Dolphins were considered the home team in the season's first International Series game.  They lost dropping them to 1-3 heading into their bye week. A day later, Head Coach Joe Philbin was fired following a 24-28 record with no postseason appearances. Tight Ends Coach Dan Campbell was his replacement serving as an Interim head coach.

Week 6: at Tennessee Titans
On a day in which Miami fans traveled well to seemingly outnumber Tennessee fans, the Dolphins would pick up their first win under Dan Campbell.

With the win, Miami improved to 2-3.

Week 7: vs. Houston Texans

The Dolphins thoroughly dominated the first half, scoring 6 touchdowns for a 41-0 halftime lead. With the win, the Miami Dolphins defeated the Houston Texans for the first time in franchise history. This was also the first time since 2003 that the Dolphins scored over 40 points in a game.

Week 8: at New England Patriots

The Dolphins travel to New England to take on the undefeated Patriots. The Dolphins looked to end the streak of the Super Bowl champions, but it was too late as Miami struggled offensively and defensively all game.

Cameron Wake left the game with an Achilles tear. The Dolphins later announced that he would miss the rest of the season. He finished the game with two tackles and a sack.

Week 9: at Buffalo Bills
With the loss, the Dolphins fell to 3-5 and were swept by Buffalo for the first time since 2013.

Week 10: at Philadelphia Eagles
The Dolphins would trail 16-3 at one point, but they would come back to beat Philadelphia. Near the end of the game, Reshad Jones intercepted Eagles backup quarterback Mark Sanchez to seal the game. This was the Dolphins' first win over the Eagles since 1999.

With the win, Miami improved to 4-5.

Week 11: vs. Dallas Cowboys
Tony Romo started this game for Dallas, and the Cowboys would snap their 7-game losing streak, while the Dolphins failed to get into any rhythm on offense or defense in the game. The Dolphins were also seeking a home win over the Cowboys for the first time since 1984. This game is known for being Romo's last win in the NFL.

With the tough loss, the Dolphins fell to 4-6.

Week 12: at New York Jets
With the loss, the Dolphins fell to 4-7.

Week 13: vs. Baltimore Ravens
With the win, Miami kept their slim playoff hopes alive, and improved to 5-7.

Week 14: vs. New York Giants
With the loss, the Dolphins fell to 5-8, and were officially eliminated from playoff contention for the 7th straight year, a franchise record. They also fell to 0-4 all time against the Giants at home, with 2003 being the last season the Dolphins beat the Giants.

Week 15: at San Diego Chargers
With the loss, the Dolphins fell to 5-9.

Week 16: vs. Indianapolis Colts
With the loss, the Dolphins fell to 5-10, and with Buffalo defeating Dallas the same day, they were assured last place in their division.

Week 17: vs. New England Patriots
With the stunning win, the Dolphins ended their season at 6-10 and kept the Patriots from clinching home field advantage in the AFC Playoffs.

Standings

Division

Conference

References

External links
 

Miami
Miami Dolphins seasons
Miami Dolphins